William T. Lord (born September 5, 1955) was the Chief of Warfighting Integration and Chief Information Officer, Office of the Secretary of the Air Force, the Pentagon, Washington, D.C. Prior to his retirement,  General Lord led five directorates and two field operating agencies consisting of more than 1,000 military, civilian and contractor personnel supporting a portfolio valued at $17 billion. He integrated Air Force warfighting and mission support capabilities by networking space, air and terrestrial assets. Additionally, he shaped doctrine, strategy, and policy for all communications and information activities while driving standards and governance, innovation, and architectures for information systems and personnel.

Biography
Lt. Gen. William T. Lord is a 1977 graduate of the United States Air Force Academy. He holds a bachelor's degree in biological and life sciences, and master's degrees in business administration and national resource strategy. Lt. Gen. William T. Lord held various duties with tours in Europe, U.S. Central Command and the White House. He has had multiple staff assignments, including two major air commands as Director of Communications and Information Systems. Lt. Gen. William T. Lord has commanded at the detachment, squadron, group, wing and joint levels.

Education
1977 Bachelor of Science degree in biological and life sciences, U.S. Air Force Academy, Colorado Springs, Colo.
1983 Squadron Officer School, Maxwell AFB, Ala.
1984 Air Command and Staff College, Maxwell AFB, Ala.
1985 Master's degree in business administration, Chapman University, Orange, Calif.
1985 Marine Corps Command and Staff College, Quantico, Va.
1989 Armed Forces Staff College, Norfolk, Va.
1992 Air War College, Maxwell AFB, Ala.
1994 Master of Science degree in national resource strategy, Industrial College of the Armed Forces, Fort Lesley J. McNair, Washington, D.C.
2004 National Fellow, Maxwell School of Citizenship and Public Affairs, Syracuse University, N.Y.
2007 National Security Studies Program, Elliott School of International Affairs, George Washington University, Washington, D.C.

Assignments
 July 1990 - March 1993, student, Communications-Electronics Officer Course, Keesler AFB, Miss.
 March 1978 - January 1981, Chief, Commercial Communications Branch, 21st North American Air Defense Region, Hancock Field, N.Y.
 January 1981 - September 1983, Commander, 2161st Communications Squadron, Royal Air Force Greenham Common, England
 September 1983 - September 1985, Program Manager, Ground-Launched Cruise Missile, 485th Engineering Installation Group, Griffiss AFB, N.Y.
 September 1995 - June 1997, Chief, Communications Architecture Division, System Integration Office, Air Force Space Command, Peterson AFB, Colo.
 April 2000 - April 2002, Director of Communications and Information, Headquarters Air Mobility Command, Scott AFB, Ill.
 April 2002 - April 2004, Director of Communications and Information, Headquarters ACC, Langley AFB, Va.
 April 2004 - November 2005, Commander, 81st Training Wing, Keesler AFB, Miss.
 November 2005 - April 2007, Director, Information, Services and Integration, Secretary of the Air Force Office of Warfighting Integration and Chief Information Officer, the Pentagon, Washington, D.C.
 April 2007 - October 2007, Director, Cyberspace Transformation and Strategy, Secretary of the Air Force Office of Warfighting Integration and Chief Information Officer, the Pentagon, Washington, D.C.
 October 2007 - July 2009, Commander, Air Force Cyber Command (Provisional), Barksdale AFB, La.
 July 2009–August 2012, Chief of Warfighting Integration and Chief Information Officer, Office of the Secretary of the Air Force, the Pentagon, Washington, D.C.

Awards and decorations

Effective dates of promotion

References

External links
 Welcome to Cyberwar Country, USA, Wired Magazine dated February 11, 2008
 , United States Air Force, www.af.mil, retrieved December 12, 2013

1955 births
United States Air Force generals
United States Air Force Academy alumni
Recipients of the Legion of Merit
Living people
Recipients of the Defense Superior Service Medal